Linepithema leucomelas is a species of ant in the genus Linepithema. Described by Emery in 1894, the species is endemic to Brazil.

References

Dolichoderinae
Hymenoptera of South America
Insects described in 1894